Dante Polvara (born June 21, 2000) is an American professional soccer player who plays for Charleston Battery on loan from Scottish Premiership club Aberdeen. Polvara played college soccer for Georgetown University. Polvara was the 2021 recipient of the Hermann Trophy awarded to the best college soccer player in the United States.

Career

Youth and college 
Polvara played for the New York City FC academy during his high school years, and was a regular starter for four years in the academy. Polvara helped NYCFC win back-to-back US Soccer Development Academy National Championships, captaining the team for their second championship. While with NYCFC Academy, Polvara played three years of high school soccer for the Brunswick School in Connecticut, where he served as captain for the program his junior year.

On December 17, 2018, Polvara signed a National Letter of Intent to play collegiately for Georgetown University in Washington, D.C. Polvara made his college debut on August 30, 2019, against Syracuse University, where he also scored his first collegiate goal. In his second match on September 2, 2019, he scored again, against Temple University. Polvara concluded his freshman campaign with 24 appearances, scoring four goals and having two assists. Polvara was also named to the 2019 Big East Conference Men's Soccer Tournament All-Tournament Team.

During his sophomore year, Polvara became a starter for the Hoyas, making 14 appearances for the program. He had his first multi-goal game on February 27, 2021, against Villanova University. He finished the 2020 season with eight goals, and was named the Big East Midfielder of the Year.

Polvara replicated his success from 2020 in the 2021 season, making 22 appearances, scoring seven times, including three goals in the 2021 NCAA Division I Men's Soccer Tournament. His success earned him the Big East Midfielder of the Year Award and First-Team All-Conference. Additionally, Polvara earned the Hermann Trophy, which is an annual award given to the top college soccer player in the country. Polvara concurrently won the TopDrawerSoccer.com Men's National Player of the Year Award.

Aberdeen FC 
Polvara decided to forgo his final year of college eligibility and opted to sign a professional contract after the 2021 NCAA Division I men's soccer season. On January 9, 2022, Polvara signed a two-and-a-half year deal with Scottish Premiership side, Aberdeen. He reportedly turned down a Homegrown contract to play with New York City FC in Major League Soccer.

On March 6, 2022, Polvara made his professional debut coming on in the 84th minute in a 0–1 loss at Rangers. He made his first start for the club in a league game against Hibernian in May 2022.

On March 8, 2023, Polvara was loaned to USL Championship side Charleston Battery for their 2023 season.

Honors 
Individual
Hermann Trophy: 2021
 ESPYS Nominee: 2022, Best Athlete, Mens Sport
TopDrawer Soccer Player of the Year: 2021
Big East Conference Midfielder of the Year: 2020, 2021
All American Scholar: 2021

References

External links 
 Dante Polvara at GUHoyas.com

2000 births
Living people
Aberdeen F.C. players
Charleston Battery players
American expatriate sportspeople in Scotland
Association football midfielders
Brunswick School alumni
Expatriate footballers in Scotland
Georgetown Hoyas men's soccer players
Hermann Trophy men's winners
People from Pleasantville, New York
Scottish Professional Football League players
Soccer players from Connecticut
Soccer players from New York (state)
USL League Two players
Association football players not categorized by nationality
American expatriate soccer players
American people of Italian descent